Her First Date (German: Ihr erstes Rendezvous) is a 1955 Austrian-West German romantic comedy film directed by Axel von Ambesser and starring Nicole Heesters, Paul Dahlke and Adrian Hoven. It was shot in Agfacolor at the Salzburg Studios and on location around the city and Lake Wolfgang. The film's sets were designed by the art director Julius von Borsody. It is a remake of the 1941 French film Premier rendez-vous, with the setting shifted to post-war Salzburg.

Cast
 Nicole Heesters as Christa, ein Waisenmädchen
 Paul Dahlke as 	Martin, Literaturprofessor
 Adrian Hoven as 	Rolf
 Karl Schönböck as 	Waldemar, Mathematikprofessor
 Erika von Thellmann as 	Fräulein Rodenstock, Aufsichtsdame im Waisenhaus
 Wera Frydtberg as Erika, Christas Freundin
 Luzi Neudecker as 	Margot, Christas freudin
 Theodor Danegger as 	Kellner im Lokal 'Capri'
 Karl Ehmann as 	Postbeamter
 Hans Fitz as 	Schuldirektor Im Bubeninternat
 Franz Fröhlich as 	Bauer am Salzburger Markt
 Fritz Grieb as 	Der komische Dicke, Schüler
 Karl Haberfellner as Der lustige Floh, Schüler
 Michael Janisch as Taxichauffeur
 Heli Lichten as Bäuerin am Salzburger Markt
 Hilde Schreiber as Elisabeth, junge Aussictsdame im Waisenhaus
 Lola Urban-Kneidinger as 	Direktorin im Waisenhaus
 Peter Vogel as Der lange Robby, Schüler
 Alexander von Richthofen as 	Der schöne Harald, Schüler

References

Bibliography 
 Fritsche, Maria. Homemade Men in Postwar Austrian Cinema: Nationhood, Genre and Masculinity. Berghahn Books, 2013.

External links 
 

1955 films
1955 comedy films
Austrian comedy films
German comedy films
West German films
1950s German-language films
Films directed by Axel von Ambesser
1950s German films
Films set in Salzburg
Remakes of French films

de:Ihr erstes Rendezvous (1955)